American rapper Latto has released two studio albums, three mixtapes, three extended plays, and 17 singles as a lead artist. In 2019, Latto released the single "Bitch from da Souf", which became her first entry on the Billboard Hot 100 following a remix with American rappers Saweetie and Trina. The follow-up single "Muwop" featuring Gucci Mane was certified Gold by the RIAA. Both singles preceded her debut studio album, Queen of da Souf, which was released in 2020 and reached number 44 on the Billboard 200. In 2021, Latto released the single "Big Energy" as the lead single from her second studio album, 777. The song became her highest-charting song to date, peaking at number 3 on the Hot 100.

Studio albums

Mixtapes

Extended plays

Singles

As lead artist

As featured artist

Promotional singles

Other charted songs

Guest appearances

Notes

References 

Discographies of American artists
Hip hop discographies